Clenílton Ataíde Cavalcante (born 24 September 1935), known as Goiano, is a Brazilian footballer. He played in three matches for the Brazil national football team in 1959. He was also part of Brazil's squad for the 1959 South American Championship that took place in Ecuador.

References

External links
 

1935 births
Living people
Brazilian footballers
Brazil international footballers
Place of birth missing (living people)
Association footballers not categorized by position